Agrostis trachychlaena is a species of grass in the family Poaceae.  It is endemic to Inaccessible and Nightingale Islands, Tristan da Cunha.  Its natural habitat is subantarctic grassland.

Less than 250 mature individuals are thought to exist.

References

trachychlaena
Endangered plants
Flora of Tristan da Cunha
Taxonomy articles created by Polbot